This is a comparison of mobile operating systems. Only the latest versions are shown in the table below, even though older versions may still be marketed.

About OS

Advanced controls

Accessibility features

App ecosystem

Browser

Basic features

Communication and connectivity

Language and inputs

Maps and navigation

Media playback and controls

Peripheral support

Photo and video

Productivity

Ringtones and alerts

Security and privacy

Sound and voice

Other features

See also
 Comparison of open-source mobile phones
 List of custom Android distributions
 Comparison of satellite navigation software

References

Mobile operating systems
Operating system comparisons
Software wars